Gustavo Antonio Ferrín Rodríguez is a Uruguayan football manager. He is the current youth football coordinator of Liverpool Montevideo.

Coaching career
He qualified the Uruguay U20 national team to the FIFA U-20 World Cup after 8 years.

In April 2010, he was appointed to manage the Peru national under-20 football team with preparation for 2011 South American Youth Championship.

In July 2012, he was selected manager for the Angolan national team, leaving the role in October 2013.

In 2017, Ferrín was the manager of Centro Atlético Fénix.

References

1959 births
Living people
Uruguayan football managers
Defensor Sporting managers
Uruguay national football team managers
Angola national football team managers
Expatriate football managers in Peru
Expatriate football managers in Angola
2013 Africa Cup of Nations managers
Centro Atlético Fénix managers
C.A. Cerro managers
Sport Áncash managers